Delaware State Forest is a Pennsylvania state forest in Pennsylvania Bureau of Forestry District #19.  The main offices are located in Swiftwater in Monroe County, Pennsylvania in the United States. 

The forest is in several tracts in Monroe and Pike counties. Northampton County is also in District #19.

History
Delaware State Forest was formed as a direct result of the depletion of the forests of Pennsylvania that took place during the mid-to-late 19th century. Conservationists like Dr. Joseph Rothrock became concerned that the forests would not regrow if they were not managed properly. Lumber and Iron companies had harvested the old-growth forests for various reasons. They clear cut the forests and left behind nothing but dried tree tops and rotting stumps. The sparks of passing steam locomotives ignited wildfires that prevented the formation of second growth forests. The conservationists feared that the forest would never regrow if there was not a change in the philosophy of forest management. They called for the state to purchase land from the lumber and iron companies and the lumber and iron companies were more than willing to sell their land since that had depleted the natural resources of the forests. The changes began to take place in 1895 when Dr. Rothrock was appointed the first commissioner of the Pennsylvania Department of Forests and Waters, the forerunner of today's Pennsylvania Department of Conservation and Natural Resources. The Pennsylvania General Assembly passed a piece of legislation in 1897 that authorized the purchase of "unseated lands for forest reservations." This was the beginning of the State Forest system.

Neighboring state forest districts
The U.S. state of New Jersey is to the east.

Pinchot State Forest (north)
William Penn State Forest (south)
Weiser State Forest (west)

Nearby state parks

Big Pocono State Park
Gouldsboro State Park
Promised Land State Park
Tobyhanna State Park

References

 Note: As of July 2006, this web page has not been updated to reflect the Pennsylvania State Forest Districts realignment.
 Note: Map showing districts after the July 1, 2005 realignment

Pennsylvania state forests
Pocono Mountains
Protected areas of Northampton County, Pennsylvania
Protected areas of Monroe County, Pennsylvania
Protected areas of Pike County, Pennsylvania